Dora Polić (born 30 August 1971) is a Croatian theatre, film and television actress. She won a Golden Arena at the 2000 Pula Film Festival.

Filmography

Television roles 
Stipe u gostima as dr. Pilzner (2012)
Provodi i sprovodi as Barbara Premijum (2011)
Bitange i princeze as Nina Majer (2007)
Smogovci (1996)

Movie roles 
Neka ostane među nama as Milka (2010)
Čovjek ispod stola as mlada majka (2009)
Crna kronika ili dan žena (2000)
Blagajnica hoće ići na more as Barica (2000)
Kanjon opasnih igara kao Mande (1998)
Tri muškarca Melite Žganjer as TV secretary (1998)
Prepoznavanje as girlfriend in cinema (1996)
Posebna vožnja (1995)
Isprani (1995)

References

External links
 

Croatian film actresses
Croatian television actresses
1971 births
Living people
Actresses from Zagreb
Golden Arena winners